The 2020 Utah Utes football team represented the University of Utah during the 2020 NCAA Division I FBS football season. The Utes were led by 16th-year head coach Kyle Whittingham and played their home games at Rice–Eccles Stadium in Salt Lake City, Utah, as members of the South Division of the Pac-12 Conference.

On August 11, 2020, the Pac-12 suspended all fall sports competitions due to the COVID-19 pandemic. On September 24, the Pac-12 announced that football teams would return to play a seven-game conference-only season beginning on November 6, with the conference championship game scheduled for December 18.

On December 18, with a 2–2 record and one game left to play, the Utes announced that they would not pursue a bid to a bowl game. The Utes won their final game, finishing their season with a 3–2 record. Running back Ty Jordan was voted the Pac-12 Offensive Freshman of the Year.

Schedule
Utah had games scheduled against BYU, Montana State, and Wyoming, but canceled these games on July 10 due to the Pac-12 Conference's decision to play a conference-only schedule due to the COVID-19 pandemic.

Rankings

Personnel

Depth chart

Game summaries

USC

at Washington

Oregon State

at Colorado

Washington State

References

Utah
Utah Utes football seasons
Utah Utes football